The 2017 Asian Women's Youth Handball Championship was the 7th edition of the championship organised by the Indonesia Handball Association under the auspices of the Asian Handball Federation. It was held in Jakarta (Indonesia) from 20 to 28 August 2017 and was played by under-17 years players. It was the first time that Indonesia staged the competition. It also acts as qualification tournament for the IHF Women's Youth World Handball Championship. Top four teams will qualify for the 2018 Women's Youth World Handball Championship to be held in Poland.

Participating teams
  (Host)
  (Defending Champion)

Round-robin

Match results

Final standings

External links
Asian Handball Federation

Asia
2017 in Indonesian sport
Asian Handball Championships
Hand